Chinatown is a neighbourhood in Vancouver, British Columbia, and is Canada's largest Chinatown.  Centered around Pender Street, it is surrounded by Gastown to the north, the Downtown financial and central business districts to the west, the Georgia Viaduct and the False Creek inlet to the south, the Downtown Eastside and the remnant of old Japantown to the northeast, and the residential neighbourhood of Strathcona to the southeast.

Due to the large ethnic Chinese presence in Vancouver — especially represented by mostly Cantonese-speaking multi-generation Chinese Canadians and first-generation immigrants from Hong Kong — the city has been referred to as "Hongcouver". However, most immigration in recent years has been Mandarin-speaking residents from Mainland China. Chinatown remains a popular tourist attraction and is one of the largest historic Chinatowns in North America, but it experienced recent decline as newer members of Vancouver's Chinese community dispersed to other parts of the metropolitan area.

Geography

The approximate borders of Chinatown as designated by the City of Vancouver are the alley between Pender and Hastings Streets, Georgia Street, Gore Avenue, and Taylor Street, although unofficially the area extends well into the rest of the Downtown Eastside. Main, Pender, and Keefer Streets are the principal areas of commercial activity.

Golden Village
It has been more recently overshadowed by the newer Chinese immigrant business district along No. 3 Road in the City of Richmond, south of Vancouver. Many affluent Hong Kong and Taiwanese immigrants have moved there since the late 1980s, coinciding with the increase of Chinese ethnic retail and restaurants in that area. This new area is designated the "Golden Village" by the City of Richmond. The proposed renaming of the area to "Chinatown" met resistance both from merchants in Vancouver's Chinatown and from non-Chinese residents and merchants in Richmond itself.

History

Early immigration and head tax 

Chinese immigrants, primarily men, first came to Vancouver in large numbers during the late 19th century, attracted in part by the British Columbia gold rush of 1858 and then the construction of the Canadian Pacific Railway in the 1880s. In the census of 1880–81, the total Chinese population in Canada was 4,383, of which the overwhelming majority (4,350) resided in British Columbia. By 1884, 17,000 Chinese immigrants had arrived in Canada to work on the railroad alone. The 1891 census counted 9,129 Chinese in Canada (8,910 in British Columbia), and the population at the 1901 census had increased to 16,792 in Canada (14,376 in British Columbia as an incomplete count). Of the estimated 16,000 Chinese immigrants in British Columbia in 1901, 2,715 lived in Victoria and another 2,011 lived in Vancouver.

By 1900, Chinatown covered the four square blocks bounded by Canton Alley (on the west), Hastings Street (on the north), Keefer Street (on the south), and Main Street (on the east, named Westminster Avenue at the time), with Pender Street (then called Dupont) as the main commercial district. During this time, Vancouver's Red Light district was present in the area, undergoing routine police checks and attempts to clean up the area. By 1906, the Dupont brothels were forced to close. As a result, several brothels and businesses moved to two parallel dirt paved, dead-end lanes off of Dupont, West of Carrall: Shanghai Alley and Canton Alley. While these immigrants were dispersed throughout Chinatown, they strongly concentrated these areas. In 1896, the health officer for the City of Vancouver reported the city had to destroy houses in Chinatown "owing to their filthy condition" and that "one could hardly pass through the [Chinatown] quarter without holding one's nose." Another health officer noted "The Chinese merchants and employers of labour endeavour to assist the health officials, and are, as a rule, willing to co-operate and help in this matter, but the lower classes of Chinese emigrants give a great deal of trouble unless constantly watched," concluding that continued immigration would lead to "circumstances and conditions which predispose to infectious disease, and serve to spread it rapidly when once it is roused into activity." This perception only worsened with the turn of the district. Residents of the area where said to face continuous "white hostility and discrimination" due to three main vices, drug problems, gambling and sex work. As these perceptions grew, the discrimination turned to violence, resulting in a destructive raid in 1907 that caused irreversible damage to the area.

Clan societies and 1907 riot 

As more people of Chinese heritage came to Vancouver, clan associations were formed to help the newcomers assimilate in their adopted homeland and to provide friendship and support. Clan societies were often formed around a shared surname lineage, county (e.g., Kaiping, Zhongshan), or other feature of identity.

Despite these efforts, discrimination against residents of the area continued to grow and eventually turned to violence. The Vancouver riots of September 1907 grew out of an anti-immigration rally being held by the Asiatic Exclusion League, resulting in significant damage to Chinatown businesses. 2,000 Chinese immigrants were displaced from their homes, and total property damage resulting from the actions of the mob of 10,000 was estimated at $15,000. One news report speculated the riot was held to intimidate a visiting Japanese delegate. Another blamed the presence of American agitators. Mackenzie King, then the Deputy Minister of Labour, was dispatched to investigate the riot and recommended the disbursement of $36,000 in compensation.

The head tax was repealed via the Chinese Immigration Act of 1923, which instead abolished Chinese immigration to Canada entirely, except in limited circumstances.

Late 20th century improvements
In 1979, the Chinatown Historic Area Planning Committee sponsored a streetscape improvement program to add various Chinese-style elements to the area, such as specially paved sidewalks and red dragon streetlamps that demarcated the area's borders while emphasizing it as a destination for heritage tourism. Starting with its designation by the province as a historic area in 1971 and subsequent economic shifts, Chinatown shifted from a central business district to playing a largely cultural role. Murality, a local non-profit, is installing a mural on East Pender Street with the aim of bringing colour and vitality to the neighbourhood.

The growth of Chinatown during much of the 20th century created a healthy, robust community that gradually became an aging one as many Chinese immigrants no longer lived nearby. Noticing local businesses suffering, the Chinatown Merchants Association cited the lack of parking and restrictive heritage district rules as impediments to new uses and renovations. Their concerns subsequently led to a relaxation of zoning laws to allow for a wider range of uses, including necessary demolition. Additions in the mid-1990s included a large parkade, a shopping mall, and the largest Chinese restaurant in Canada. More residential projects around the community and a lowering of property taxes helped to maintain a more rounded community. Reinvigoration was a discussed topic along government members, symbolically embedded in the Millennium Gate project, which opened in 2002. It can be argued that the role of the early Chinese settlers in Vancouver's Chinatown area in the late 19th and early 20th centuries helped to put Vancouver on the global map as a popular destination for Asian investment and immigration.

Recent immigration

In addition to Han Chinese from Taiwan, Hong Kong, and Mainland China, Chinese Latin Americans have also settled in the Chinatown area. Most of them were from Peru and arrived shortly after Juan Velasco Alvarado took over that country in a military coup in 1968. Others have come from Argentina, Brazil, Mexico, and Nicaragua.

Vancouver experienced large numbers of immigrants from the Asia-Pacific region in the last two decades of the twentieth century, most notably from China, whose population in the Vancouver Census Metropolitan Area was estimated at 300,000 in the mid-1990s. A significant development since the 1980s has been the increase of transnational awareness among the Chinese. The heightened mobility of capital, information, people, and commodities across territorial boundaries and distance challenged the traditional meaning of migration.

Compared to Chinatown itself, more Chinese immigrants have settled in Richmond, drawn by its lower house prices, considerable concentration of Chinese retailers, and the nearby Vancouver airport. The business heart of Chinatown was visibly affected after the arrival of suburban Asian shopping districts, such as Richmond's Aberdeen Centre, which was promoted as North America's largest enclosed Asian mall, was near other Chinese shopping centres, and which offered more parking and open space than historic Chinatown.

Businesses and development

Chinatown is becoming more prosperous as new investment and old traditional businesses flourish. Today the neighbourhood features many traditional restaurants, banks, markets, clinics, tea shops, clothing stores, and other shops catering to the local community and tourists alike. The Vancouver office of Sing Tao Daily, one of the city's four Chinese-language dailies, remains in Chinatown. OMNI British Columbia (formerly Channel M) had its television studio in Chinatown from 2003 to 2010. Vancouver Film School also has a satellite location in Chinatown. The renowned bar & nightclub known as ‘Fortune Sound Club’ is situated within the heart of Chinatown (formerly Ming’s Restaurant). As of 2019, they have grown to become one of the most popular night clubs in all of BC, rivalling off the Granville Entertainment District and bringing in world-class musicians.

Chinatown's businesses today predominantly consist of those selling lower-order, working-class goods, such as groceries, tea shops, and souvenir stores. While some businesses, such as restaurants, stand out, they are no longer the only Chinese food establishments in the city, a shift that contributed to a visible decline in foot traffic and nighttime activity in Chinatown. As the vacancy rate in Chinatown currently stands at 10%, it has been acknowledged that Chinatown needs a new approach to development, since some businesses have relocated to suburban shopping centres while others simply retired or went out of business. Examples include the closing of some restaurants and shops, sometimes in instances where the family did not have successors or where the business could not sustain itself any longer. Although there is a considerable business vacancy, Chinatown lease rates are considered the cheapest in the city, at $15–$30 per square foot—about one-tenth of the asking price on Vancouver's Downtown Robson Street, the city's upscale shopping district.

The new Chinatown business plan encourages new entrepreneurs to move in—and has attracted a longboard store and German sausage shop—as ways of restoring storefronts and bringing in a younger crowd, and to make higher-income people more comfortable in the area. Attracted to the lower rent and the building's heritage status, younger businesses have moved in, often with white owners who also live in apartments above the shops. The general consensus is that Chinatown's priority is to attract people of all backgrounds to Chinatown, and it is believed that the opening of non-traditional stores will bring a new flow of energy and income to the streets. As a result, the commercial activity is becoming more diversified, dotted with Western chain stores such as Waves Coffeeshop and Dollar Giant. Other additions include vintage stores, two art galleries, bars, and a nightclub, built on the site of the former Ming's restaurant, in an attempt to bring something of a nightlife atmosphere, reminiscent of the 1950s and 1960s, back to the neighbourhood. The diversity of new shops and businesses is believed to be necessary in creating a new image for Chinatown in order to bring vibrancy back to the area and encourage commercial activities in general, and as a way to compete with suburban districts as well as nearby Gastown and Downtown Vancouver.

Chinatown Revitalization Action Plan
The Chinatown Historic Area planning committee, along with AECOM Economics, a US-based planning firm, helped to prepare a Chinatown Revitalization Action Plan for Vancouver's planning department in November 2011. Vancouver planners surveyed 77 businesses and found that 64% reported a decrease in revenue between 2008 and 2011. The majority of consumers, 58%, were local residents, with 21% coming from elsewhere in the Lower Mainland. Tourist spending accounted for only 12% of Chinatown customers. Recognizing the shifting role of Chinatown, the report highlighted key points to help the district keep up with the times:

Although Chinatown experienced rapid residential growth, Vancouver's Chinese population is no longer concentrated in the Chinatown area, as new immigration settlement is dispersed throughout Metro Vancouver, especially in Richmond.
Historically, Chinese immigrants to Vancouver were predominantly from Southern China, while immigrants today come from throughout China and Asia. Therefore, Chinatown restaurants need to broaden their offerings beyond mostly Cantonese dishes to cuisine from other parts of China and Asia in order to serve a more diversified consumer base.

Building on these points, the report recommended that Chinatown needs:
More life on the streets at night and on weekends as a way to dilute social problems
To provide better restaurants, as these make up the heart of Chinatown and are key to improving its business sector
To modernize the cultural centre and museum as a viable attraction while keeping its neighbourhood aspects
To cater more to its residents through everyday services such as groceries and restaurants
To take advantage of its fine-grained streetscape pattern, which offers a unique sidewalk experience compared to newer auto-oriented suburban areas
To involve younger community members in decision-making roles
To renovate its 20 heritage buildings, creating a historic district unparalleled in Western Canada, which will increase appeal to tourists and residents, leading to more local spending
To be clean and safe in order to reduce negative images, such as illegal drug use and panhandling, associated with the Downtown Eastside in general

Some plans already in place in order to preserve some Asian heritage include the creation of the Chinatown Storytelling Centre. It is a purpose-built cultural space that celebrates stories of the Chinese Canadian experience told through the lens of Vancouver's Chinatown. The Storytelling Centre shares the important legacy and history of the Chinese Canadian experience and its larger contribution to city and nation-building. The Storytelling Centre is set to open in 2020.

International Village

In recent years Chinatown has seen growth in new construction as a downtown building boom continued into the former Expo 86 lands, which adjoin Chinatown. New high-rise towers are being constructed around the old Expo 86 site, including International Village, which was built in 1998 and is located next to Stadium–Chinatown SkyTrain station. Anchored by Cineplex Odeon International Village Cinemas and flanked by Rexall Drugstore and Yokoyaya 123, the International Village Shopping Centre is a 300,000 ft² entertainment and shopping venue. It is one of the first master-planned communities in Greater Vancouver; is the central hub connecting Gastown, Chinatown, and Yaletown; and is adjacent to the Rogers Arena, the Plaza of Nations, and BC Place Stadium.

International Village was designed to be downtown's answer to the Asian malls found in the Golden Village, though it is not as racially exclusive and includes businesses and residents that are non-Chinese.

International Village also refers to the name given to the area by developer Henderson Development (Canada) Ltd., a subsidiary of Henderson Land Development.

International Village was commonly called Tinseltown, based on one of the brands of theatre chain Cinemark Theatres, which owned the building before Cineplex did.

Condominium development

Vancouver city councillors voted in 2011 to raise building height restrictions in Chinatown in order to boost its population density. A limit of 9 stories for most of the neighbourhood was set, with a maximum of 15 stories on the busiest streets. Highrises close to Stadium-Chinatown Station have already been built, with more condominium towers under construction, some projects taking advantage of empty lots that sat unused for decades. Due to the unconventional lot sizes, one 9-storey condominium is only 25 feet wide. However, that is not expected to be a problem in Vancouver, which has a market for affordable smaller-scale homes. Critics of highrise development speculate that the plan will effectively divide up the neighbourhood to form a "Great Wall of Chinatown" as lower-income residents are marginalized and displaced.

Architecture

The neighbourhood was designated a National Historic Site of Canada in 2011.

Ongoing efforts at revitalization include efforts by the business community to improve safety by hiring private security, considering new marketing promotions, and introducing residential units into the neighbourhood by restoring and renovating heritage buildings. The current focus is on the restoration and adaptive reuse of the distinctive association buildings.

Gates

The China Gate (next to the Chinese Cultural Centre, near the intersection with Carrall) facing Pender Street was donated to the City of Vancouver by the Government of the People's Republic of China following the Expo 86 world's fair, where it was on display. After being displayed for almost 20 years at its current location, the gate was rebuilt and received a major renovation of its façade employing stone and steel. Funding for the renovation came from government and private sources; the renovated gate was unveiled during the October 2005 visit of Guangdong governor Huang Huahua.

This is not to be confused with the larger Millennium Gate, which straddles Pender Street at the west end of Chinatown, near the intersection with Taylor Street. The Millennium Gate was approved on September 20, 2001, and erected in 2002 at the same site as a temporary wooden arch built to celebrate the 1901 royal tour by the Duke and Duchess of Cornwall and York. Joe Y. Wai designed the Millennium Gate.

Notable buildings
The Sam Kee Company, run by Chang Toy, one of the wealthier merchants in turn-of-the-20th-century Chinatown, bought the land for the Sam Kee Building as a standard-sized lot in 1903. However, in 1912 the city widened Pender Street, expropriating all but 6 feet of the Pender Street side of the lot. This lot was the previous home to Shanghai Alley, an early Vancouver red light district which collaboratively hosted 105 brothels with Canton Alley. In 1913 the architects Brown and Gillam designed this narrow, steel-framed free-standing building on the remaining 6-foot strip. The basement, extending under the sidewalk and much wider than the rest of the building, housed public baths, with shops on the ground floor and offices above (such basements in Vancouver were once common and zoned as "areaways"). The 1980s' rehabilitation of the building for Jack Chow was designed by Soren Rasmussen Architect and completed in 1986.

The Lord Strathcona Elementary School is the oldest public school in Greater Vancouver and the only public school serving Vancouver's Chinatown.

Neon signs

Chinatown was once known for its neon signs, but like the rest of the city, lost many signs to changing times and a sign bylaw passed in 1974. The last of these was the Ho Ho sign (which showed a rice bowl and chop sticks), which was removed in 1997.

The new sign was installed in March 2010.

In 2017, a neon sign featuring a large green and yellow-coloured rooster for the Sai Woo Restaurant was installed on Pender Street. The new owner of the Sai Woo was made aware of the original sign that hung outside the earlier incarnation of the restaurant (1925–59) from a one-second clip from a movie of a 1958 parade in Chinatown, and launched a search for the original sign which was unsuccessful. The sign was recreated from the archived footage. At the same time, plans were announced to relight the tall Ho Ho sign in 2018 or 2019.

Laozi Mural
Vancouver's Laozi (also referred to "Lao Tzu" and "Lao Tsu", 老子) mural is located on the Western wall of the Lee's Association building, at the corner of Gore Avenue and Pender Street, on the boundary of Chinatown. The mural was unveiled on October 2, 2010, by the Mayor of the City of Vancouver, Gregor Robertson. as part of the celebration of the 125 years of Vancouver's Chinatown. The mural is featured in multiple lists of notable Vancouver murals.

It was designed by Kenson Seto and painted by Alex Li & Falk. The mural is 223 square metres, and cost $18,000   which was split between the City of Vancouver and Lee's Association of Vancouver. It was defaced multiple times by graffiti, causing outrage in the community.

On April 5, 2016, the City of Vancouver rezoned the lot at 303 E Pender St/450 Gore Avenue, allowing construction of a six story building  that hid the mural from sight. The building, marketed as Brixton Flats  was designed by architect Gair Williamson and developed by GMC Projects Inc., whose website features an image of the Laozi mural 

Vancouver City Council added a condition to the rezoning: "Design development to create a new mural to reflect the character and history of Chinatown;Note to Applicant: The intent is not to recreate the existing mural, but rather to seek a viable opportunity to create a new mural of a suitable size and location on the building, including possible location on the eastern side of the building."The developer is studying the possibility of painting a smaller version of the original mural on the new building.

See also
 Chinese Benevolent Association of Vancouver
 Chinese Canadians in British Columbia
 Chinese Canadians in Greater Vancouver
 Chinese Canadians in the Greater Toronto Area
 History of Chinese immigration to Canada
 Chinese head tax in Canada
 Royal Commission on Chinese Immigration (1885)
 Chinese Immigration Act of 1885
 Chinese Immigration Act, 1923
Everything Will Be, Julia Kwan's 2014 documentary film about Chinatown

Notable residents
Wong Foon Sien, journalist and social activist
Bessie Lee, community organizer and civic activist
Mary Lee Chan, civic activist
Yip Sang, businessman
Yucho Chow, photographer
Wayson Choy, author, educator

Community groups 
 Hua Foundation, non-profit building community engagement in environmentalism and sustainability

References

Further reading

 Reprinted in 1996, Social Geography: A Reader, ed. Hamnett C., (Arnold, London)
 Reprinted in 1992, A Daunting Modernity: A Reader in Post-Confederation Canada ed. McKay, I (McGraw-Hill Ryerson, Ontario).

External links

 Vancouver Chinatown Revitalization Committee website
 "For the love of Chinatown," 1968 clip from CBC Radio
 Chinese Community Policing Centre
 Vincent Miller, "Mobile Chinatowns: The Future of Community in a Global Space of Flows." Article analyzing the differences between Vancouver's Chinatown and the Chinese community in Richmond.
"Yin and Yang: Chinatown Past and Present," Multimedia site from Knowledge Network based on Paul Yee's book, Saltwater City: An Illustrated History of the Chinese in Vancouver,Vancouver: Douglas & McIntyre, 1988.
 Walking Tour: Chinatown
 "Chinatown Revitalization Project on the City of Vancouver Planning Department"
 "Chinatown Canada: The first in a four-part video series about Canada's Chinatowns from CityTv"
 Vancouver Chinatown - Simon Fraser University

Chinese-Canadian culture in Vancouver
Vancouver
Ethnic enclaves in British Columbia
History of Vancouver
Neighbourhoods in Vancouver
Night markets
Retail markets in Canada
Shopping districts and streets in Canada
Tourist attractions in Vancouver
National Historic Sites in British Columbia